Mohamed Naoufel Khacef (born 27 October 1997) is an Algerian footballer who plays for CD Tondela in the Liga Portugal 2. He plays primarily as a left-back.

Club career
In 2020, he played for Girondins de Bordeaux B.

International career
In July 2015, Khacef was called up to the Algeria under-20 national team.

He made his debut for Algeria national football team on 29 March 2021 in a 2021 Africa Cup of Nations qualifier against Botswana.

References

External links
 
 

1997 births
Algerian footballers
Algeria under-23 international footballers
Algeria international footballers
Algerian Ligue Professionnelle 1 players
People from Kouba
Living people
NA Hussein Dey players
USM Alger players
Footballers from Algiers
Association football fullbacks
FC Girondins de Bordeaux players
Primeira Liga players
C.D. Tondela players
Expatriate footballers in France
Expatriate footballers in Portugal
Algerian expatriate sportspeople in Portugal
Algerian expatriate sportspeople in France
USM Blida players
21st-century Algerian people